Sunshine Radio (Thailand) is a community radio station in Thailand which plays Thai adult contemporary music. It broadcasts in Pattaya, Hat Yai and Phuket. Its slogan is "Good Life, Good Music".

Stations
 Sunshine Radio Pattaya 107.75

Former stations
 Sunshine Radio Songkhla 94.5
 Sunshine Radio Chiangmai 105.75
 Sunshine Radio Hat Yai 103.0
 Sunshine Radio Phuket 96.75

Frequencies
 103.0 MHz covers Hat Yai District, some parts of Songkhla Province, Pattani Province, Yala Province and Satun Province and also parts of northern Kedah in Malaysia.
 96.7 MHz covers Phuket and some parts of Phang Nga and Krabi provinces.
 107.7 MHz covers Pattaya and some parts of Chonburi, Chachoengsao, Chanthaburi and Rayong provinces.

External links
 Sunshine Radio Pattaya 107.75 Official website
 Sunshine Radio Hat Yai 103.0 Official website
 Sunshine Radio Phuket 96.75 Official website

Radio stations in Thailand